Lachy may refer to:

 Lachy, Marne, a commune in the Marne department in north-eastern France
 Lachy or Lendians, an ancient Polish tribe
 Lachy Sądeckie, the Lachy culture of the Sądeckie region of Poland
 Lachy, Podlaskie Voivodeship, a village in north-eastern Poland

See also
Lachlan (name), Lachy is a pet form of the name Lachlan